Symphyotrichum frondosum (formerly Aster frondosus) is a species of flowering plant in the family Asteraceae native to western North America.

Description
The leaves are a few centimeters long and oval in shape with rounded tips. The stem and leaves are mostly hairless.

The inflorescence is a small array of flower heads containing many short pale pink or lavender ray florets and yellow disc florets. The fruit is a hairy cypsela with white to yellow-tinted pappi.

Distribution and habitat
It is native to North America in the west from British Columbia, south to Baja California (Mexico), east to New Mexico, and north to Wyoming and Idaho. Symphyotrichum frondosum grows in wet habitats such as marshes and meadows, especially in alkaline or saline conditions.

Citations

References

External links
 
 

frondosum
Halophytes
Flora of the Western United States
Flora of British Columbia
Flora of California
Flora of New Mexico
Flora of the Sierra Nevada (United States)
Flora of the Rocky Mountains
Plants used in traditional Native American medicine
Plants described in 1840
Taxa named by Thomas Nuttall